Aggro-Phobia is the fourth studio album by Suzi Quatro, recorded in the Autumn of 1976. It is the only one of her albums to be co-produced by Mickie Most.

The song "Tear Me Apart" reached No. 27 on the UK singles chart in October 1977. Writing for Bomp!, music critic Ken Barnes called it "excellent" and "superior to [her] earlier hits".

Track listing

Original album (1976)
 "Heartbreak Hotel" (Elvis Presley, Mae Boren Axton, Tommy Durden) - 3:48
 "Don't Break My Heart" (Suzi Quatro, Len Tuckey) - 2:53
 "Make Me Smile (Come Up and See Me)" (Steve Harley) - 3:43
 "What's It Like to Be Loved" (Quatro, Tuckey) - 3:13
 "Tear Me Apart" (Mike Chapman, Nicky Chinn) - 2:59
 "The Honky Tonk Downstairs" (Dallas Frazier) - 3:00
 "Half as Much as Me" (Quatro, Tuckey) - 4:12
 "Close the Door" (Quatro, Tuckey) - 3:47
 "American Lady" (Quatro, Tuckey) - 3:41
 "Wake Up Little Susie" (Felice Bryant) - 2:49

Charts

Personnel
 Suzi Quatro - lead vocals, bass guitar, writer
 Len Tuckey - lead guitar, backing vocals, writer
 Dave Neal - drums, backing vocals
 Mike Deacon - keyboards, backing vocals
 Mike Chapman - producer, writer
 Nicky Chinn - writer
 Mickie Most - producer

References

External links

Suzi Quatro albums
Rak Records albums
Albums produced by Mike Chapman
Albums produced by Mickie Most
1976 albums